Eleanor Crockett Pressly (1918 – May 10, 2003) was an American mathematician and aeronautical engineer in the sounding rocket program at NASA's Goddard Space Flight Center.

Early life 
Eleanor Crockett Pressly was born in Due West, South Carolina, the only child of Samuel Agnew Pressly and Georgia Crockett Pressly. She earned a bachelor's degree at Erskine College in 1938, and a master's degree in mathematics at Duke University in 1943.

Career 
During World War II, Pressly taught mathematics to air corps students at Winthrop College and worked at Radio Research Laboratory at Harvard University. After the war, she was a mathematician and aeronautical research engineer at the United States Naval Research Laboratory and was a member of the American Rocket Society. She also oversaw launches at White Sands Missile Range and Fort Churchill in Manitoba. "No matter how many times it happens, I can never get over the excitement of a launching," she told an interviewer in 1957.

Pressly transferred to the Goddard Space Flight Center soon after it opened in 1958, and was head of the Vehicles Section in the Spacecraft Integration and Sounding Rocket Division, in charge of probes launched into the upper atmosphere. She developed the Aerobee Jr., co-developed Aerobee-Hi 150, and oversaw the design of the Aerobee Hi 150 A, all sounding rockets used during the International Geophysical Year (1957–1958). When James E. Webb spoke to the General Federation of Women's Clubs in 1962, he mentioned Pressly by name as one of the women in a "position of importance" at NASA.

In 1963 Pressly was one of the six recipients of the Federal Woman's Award, given to career federal employees who made significant contributions to their programs. In 1964, Lady Bird Johnson invited Pressly to the White House again, for a luncheon about women in the space program. In 1966, she chaired a panel at the Conference on Unguided Rocket Ballistics in El Paso, Texas. In 1981 she was honored with the Mary Mildred Sullivan Award from the Erskine Alumni Association.

Publications 
Publications by Pressly included "Counting with Geiger Counters" (Review of Scientific Instruments 1949, with Homer E. Newell), Upper Atmosphere Research Report Number 21. Summary of Upper Atmosphere Rocket Research Firings (Naval Research Laboratory, February 1954, with Charles P. Smith Jr.), "A Mass Spectrometric Study of the Upper Atmosphere" (1954, with John W. Townsend Jr. and Edith B. Meadows), "Future Sounding Rockets" (1958, with Newell and Townsend) "The Aerobee Rocket" (1958, with Townsend and James Van Allen), and "The Sounding Rocket as a Tool for College and University Research" (NASA, December 1962).

Personal life 
Pressly died in Rockville, Maryland, in 2003, aged 84 years.  Her only noted survivor was a cousin.

References

External links 
 Eleanor C. Pressly on WorldCat.
 Alfred Rosenthal, Venture into Space: Early Years of Goddard Space Flight Center (NASA 1968).

1918 births
2003 deaths
Erskine College alumni
Duke University alumni
20th-century American mathematicians
Aeronautical engineers
Goddard Space Flight Center people
People from Abbeville County, South Carolina
American women mathematicians
20th-century American engineers
American women engineers
Mathematicians from South Carolina
Engineers from South Carolina
20th-century American women
21st-century American women